A Whole New Thing is the debut album by funk/soul band Sly and the Family Stone, released in 1967 on Epic/CBS Records. The album was released to mixed criticism and failed to make an impact from a commercial standpoint and did not chart. CBS Records executive Clive Davis prevailed upon band leader Sly Stone to create a more commercial album; the result was the album Dance to the Music. Unlike later Sly and the Family Stone albums, A Whole New Thing was recorded live in the studio instead of being overdubbed and featured less of a pop feel than later releases such as Dance to the Music and Stand!. The lead vocals are shared between Sly Stone, Freddie Stone, and Larry Graham; Rose Stone would not join the band until they began work on Dance to the Music.

Track listing
All tracks written by Sylvester Stewart, and produced and arranged by Sly Stone for Stone Flower Productions.

Side one
"Underdog" – 3:59
"If This Room Could Talk" – 3:00
"Run, Run, Run" – 3:14
"Turn Me Loose" – 1:52
"Let Me Hear It from You" – 3:35
"Advice" – 2:22

Side two
"I Cannot Make It" – 3:20
"Trip to Your Heart" – 3:43
"I Hate to Love Her" – 3:30
"Bad Risk" – 3:04
"That Kind of Person" – 4:25
"Dog" – 3:10

CD bonus tracks
1995 CD reissue:
"What Would I Do"
2007 CD limited edition reissue:
 "Underdog" (mono B-side version) [3:04]
 "Let Me Hear It From You" (mono B-side version) [3:28]
 "Only One Way Out of This Mess" [3:51]
 "What Would I Do" [4:05]
 "You Better Help Yourself" (instrumental version) [4:19]

Personnel
Sly and the Family Stone
 Sly Stone – vocals, organ, guitar, piano, celeste, harmonica, and more
 Freddie Stone – vocals, guitar
 Larry Graham – vocals, bass guitar
 Cynthia Robinson – trumpet, vocal ad-libs
 Jerry Martini – saxophone
 Greg Errico – drums
 Little Sister (Vet Stone, Mary McCreary, Elva Mouton) – background vocals

References

Sly and the Family Stone albums
1967 debut albums
Epic Records albums
Albums produced by Sly Stone
Albums arranged by Sly Stone